The 2020 UCI World Tour was a series of races that was scheduled to include thirty-six road cycling events throughout the 2020 cycling season. However, some of races were cancelled due to the COVID-19 pandemic. The tour started with the opening stage of the Tour Down Under on 21 January, and concluded with the final stage of the Vuelta a España on 8 November.

Events
The 2020 calendar was initially announced in June 2019. In October 2019, the calendar was officially presented by the UCI.

There were two races fewer in the original schedule than in the 2019 UCI World Tour:
The Presidential Cycling Tour of Turkey was downgraded to the UCI ProSeries for 2020 due to lack of participation of UCI World Tour teams in 2018 and 2019.
The Tour of California was not held in 2020 after being placed on hiatus.

Due to the COVID-19 pandemic that commenced in the spring, numerous races were postponed, including all three Grand Tours and four of the five annual 'monuments'. As a result, race organisers requested new date allocations with the Union Cycliste Internationale (UCI) for many of these events. On 5 May 2020, a revised calendar was announced by the UCI, with 25 races to be held between 1 August and 8 November; several races are scheduled to overlap, including the Giro d'Italia, the Vuelta a España and Paris–Roubaix. Of the 25, Eschborn–Frankfurt and the EuroEyes Cyclassics had dates still to be confirmed at the time of the calendar's publication. Further amendments were made to the calendar in June, with two more races being cancelled, several others moving dates and the EuroEyes Cyclassics was scheduled for October.

Cancelled events
A total of fifteen events were not able to be rescheduled, or were definitively cancelled during the 2020 season. The centennial Volta a Catalunya (23–29 March), the Tour of the Basque Country (6–11 April), the Tour de Romandie (28 April to 3 May), the Tour de Suisse (7–14 June), and the Clásica de San Sebastián (25 July) were all cancelled prior to any updated calendars being released by the UCI. Following the May calendar update, the E3 BinckBank Classic (27 March), and the RideLondon–Surrey Classic (16 August) were both cancelled; in the June calendar update, Eschborn–Frankfurt (initially scheduled for 1 May), and Dwars door Vlaanderen (having been rescheduled for 14 October) were also cancelled. In July, the EuroEyes Cyclassics (initially scheduled for 16 August, and then rescheduled to 3 October), and the two Canadian races in Québec City and Montréal (scheduled for 11 and 13 September) were cancelled.

Following the recommencement of racing on 1 August, the season-ending Tour of Guangxi (initially scheduled for 15–20 October, and then rescheduled to 5–10 November) was cancelled on 10 August. On 30 September, the day after Dutch stages were removed from the BinckBank Tour, the Amstel Gold Race (initially scheduled for 19 April, and then rescheduled to 10 October), was cancelled following a surge of cases attributed to the COVID-19 pandemic in the Netherlands. On 9 October, Paris–Roubaix (initially scheduled for 12 April, and then rescheduled to 25 October) was cancelled after a rise in cases attributed to the COVID-19 pandemic in France.

Notes

References

External links

 
2020
2020 in men's road cycling
UCI World Tour